James Savage (born 12 May 1876, date of death unknown) was an English professional footballer who played as a winger. He played in the Football League for Burnley, in addition to spells in non-league football with Nelson and Trawden Forest.

References

English footballers
Association football wingers
Nelson F.C. players
Burnley F.C. players
Trawden Forest F.C. players
English Football League players
Year of death missing
1876 births